Andrés Felipe Aguilar Gimper (born 7 December 1996) is a Chilean archer. He competed at the 2020 Summer Olympics in the individual competition.

In addition to the Olympics, Aguilar has also represented Chile at the Archery World Championships, Pan American Games, Pan American Archery Championships, and the Archery World Cup.

References

Chilean male archers
1996 births
Living people
Archers at the 2020 Summer Olympics
Olympic archers of Chile
Archers at the 2019 Pan American Games
Sportspeople from Santiago
Pan American Games competitors for Chile
Archers at the 2015 Pan American Games
20th-century Chilean people
21st-century Chilean people
Pan American Games silver medalists for Chile
Pan American Games medalists in archery
Medalists at the 2019 Pan American Games